Clouds Blur the Rainbow: The Other Side of New Alliance Party is a non-fiction report by Chip Berlet, published in 1987 by Political Research Associates (PRA). Berlet presents his view that Lenora Fulani and her campaign manager and tactician Fred Newman "use totalitarian deception to manipulate social and political activists, and describe Newman and Fulani's therapeutic approach, Social Therapy, as "totalitarian cultism".

Berlet concludes that the relationship between the New Alliance Party and the Social Therapy practice of Newman and Fulani was "manipulative and unethical", and that "the NAP must be judged in the context of being a political movement that lacks clarity concerning basic moral issues involving personal and political exploitation."

Portions of the report appeared in an issue of the Marxist journal Radical America published in November 1988 under the title "Fiction and the New Alliance Party." The introduction by the journal's editors article noted that Fulani's New Alliance Party has attracted people "seeking something radical", but that the NAP had failed the journal's test for a "legitimate left organization", that NAP and its affiliates "were not just other legitimate groups with whom we must co-exist", and that the readers of the report who find anyone who is attracted to Fulani's NAP should "actively try to dissuade them from pursuing this course".

Cited in secondary works 
Berlet and Lyons cite the report in their 2000 work, Right-Wing Populism in America: Too Close for Comfort.  The report is cited in Evan Mandery's 2001 book on the history of political campaigns, Eyes on City Hall, and in an essay in the 2002 book My Enemy's Enemy.

In citing Clouds Blur the Rainbow in a 2004 article, Doug Ireland of The Nation referred to Chip Berlet as "Political Research Associates' excellent senior analyst".  The same article criticized what the author referred to as "the ultrasectarian cult-racket formerly known as the New Alliance Party."  The work is also cited by Dennis Tourish and Tim Wohlforth, in their book: On the Edge: Political cults right and left.  The Buffalo News also cited the work in an article analyzing the New Alliance Party.

Responses by defenders of Newman

Defenders of Newman note that the report was published and distributed during the 1988 Presidential campaign of Marxist psychologist and political activist Lenora Fulani. Fulani went on to garner a quarter of a million votes and became the first African American and first woman to achieve ballot status in all 50 states.

In a 1991 interview, Newman described the criticisms as "absurd" and the product of jealousies on the left, and claimed that the majority of social therapy clients don't involve themselves in his political activities. In the Boston Globe in 1992, Fulani claimed "the entire thing is a lie", and cited what she described as Political Research Associates ties to the Democratic Party.

Berlet's claims of cultism  have been disputed by some of Newman's peers in the therapeutic milieu. According to British psychologist Ian Parker, "Even those [Newman and Holzman] who have been marked by the FBI as a 'cult' may still be a source of useful radical theory and practice. Like a weed, a cult is something that is growing in the wrong place. We would want to ask 'wrong' for who, and whether it might sometimes be right for us. We have no desire to line up with the psychological establishment to rule out of the debate those who offer something valuable to anti-racist, feminist or working-class practice."

The report and the FBI 
The report also figured in a 1993 lawsuit filed in the United States District Court for the Southern District of New York by Fulani and Newman against the FBI and Janet Reno. FBI documents obtained through the Freedom of Information Act showed that the FBI had classified Fulani's New Alliance Party as a "political cult" which "should be considered armed and dangerous." A copy of Clouds Blur the Rainbow was amongst the items that were contained in the FBI files.

Newman, Fulani and the New Alliance Party challenged the FBI in the lawsuit, asserting the FBI "political cult" labeling had violated their constitutional rights, and was using private third-party organizations to evade federal guidelines prohibiting investigations of political organizations in the absence of evidence of criminal activity. In her ruling on the case, Federal judge Constance Baker Motley ruled that the "political cult" charge "could not be directly traced to the 1988 FBI investigation", and that "any stigmatization which NAP suffers could be traced to a myriad of statements and publications made by private individuals and organizations, many of which preceded the FBI investigation.

Berlet, while upholding the charge of cultism, was critical of the FBI, noting that FBI characterizations were "not a protection of civil liberties but a smear of a group." Washington City Paper reporter Kelvyn Anderson wrote at the time that the FBI investigation "sends a chilling political message: Groups outside of the political norm operate at their own risk and should expect state-sanctioned surveillance and intrusion into their affairs."

Lenora Fulani referred to the report in a public address in 2006, saying:  "It was all a pack of lies – making false allegations of anti-Semitism and cultism against me and Dr. Newman. It was fairly vicious.".  In an article on BlackElectorate.com, Fulani characterized the book as a "diatribe" written by "white leftists."

References

External links
publiceye.org has an online version listed by chapter.

1987 non-fiction books
Books about politics of the United States